Joaquim da Silva Furtado (Penamacor, 1948) is a Portuguese journalist, reporter, television anchor and documentary film director. He worked during almost all his entire career for state-run RTP television network, including in RTP 2 for many years. 

He became a well-known media personality during the Carnation Revolution military coup on April 25, 1974. On the first hours of that day, he was working as a broadcaster in the Rádio Clube Português (RCP) radio station when the revolutionary Armed Forces Movement (MFA) took the power in order to overthrow the Estado Novo regime, and Furtado read the first communiqué of the rebellious military officers. 

In the 2000s he achieved wide popularity in Portugal after directing the documentary A Guerra, a thoroughly detailed description of the events around the Portuguese Colonial War (1961-1974). Joaquim Furtado is also the father of actress and television presenter Catarina Furtado.

External links

References

1948 births
Living people
People from Penamacor
Portuguese journalists
Male journalists
Portuguese radio presenters